Scepastopyga is a genus of flies in the family Dolichopodidae from Papua New Guinea. There is only one described species, Scepastopyga semiflava, described by Patrick Grootaert and Henk J. G. Meuffels in 1997. It is small, with a body length of about 2 mm, and is coloured yellow or brown without a metallic gloss.

The generic name is derived from the Greek words skepastós ("covered") and pygè ("rump").

References

Dolichopodidae genera
Achalcinae
Insects of Papua New Guinea
Monotypic Diptera genera